Pattabhishekam is a 1985 Indian Telugu-language romantic film produced by Nandamuri Harikrishna in Ramakrishna Cine Studios banner and directed by K. Raghavendra Rao. It stars Nandamuri Balakrishna, Vijayashanti  and  music composed by Chakravarthy.

Plot
Balu (Nandamuri Balakrishna) & Hema (Vijaya Shanti) are love birds at the college. Balu is brought up by his brother Seetaram (Sarath Babu) & sister-in-law Janaki (Sarada) whom he adores, whereas Hema is the daughter of millionaire Markendeyulu (Rao Gopal Rao). Here, the status barrier obstructs the love birds and Markendeyulu opposes the match. Rajesh (Rajendra Prasad) their mischievous fellow collegian aspires to possess Hema, so, he continuously creates rifts to them. Being an unbeknownst, Markendeyulu fixes Hema of alliance with his nephew Mastan Rao (Kannada Prabhakar) a brutal. Later, he is aware of his diabolic shade through Rajesh and tries to double-cross him but unfortunately, he is seized. At last, Balu rescues them all by ceasing Mastan Rao where Markendeyulu reforms. Finally, the movie ends on a happy note with the marriage of Balu & Hema.

Cast

Nandamuri Balakrishna as Balu
Vijayashanti as Hema
Rao Gopal Rao as Markandeyulu
Sharada as Janaki
Rajendra Prasad as Rajesh
Kannada Prabhakar as Mastan Rao 
Nutan Prasad as Hanumanthu
Sarath Babu as Lawyer Seetaram
Chalapathi Rao as C.I. Krishna Murthy
Raj Varma as Chinna Rao
Chidatala Appa Rao 
Chitti Babu 
P. J. Sarma as Principal
Mada as Tennis Coach
Madan Mohan
Jagga Rao
Suryakantam as Warden Kantamma
Sri Lakshmi as Hema's friend
Kalpana Rai as Servant
Y. Vijaya as Sumathi

Soundtrack

Music composed by Chakravarthy. Lyrics were written by Veturi. Music released on AVM Audio.

Release
The film was released on 19 December 1985 to mixed reviews. The film was declared a Hit at the box office.

References

External links

1985 films
1980s Telugu-language films
1985 romantic drama films
Indian romantic drama films
1980s masala films
Films directed by K. Raghavendra Rao
Films scored by K. Chakravarthy